In 2007, the common theme for the Europa coins was European Realisation. At least 11 countries have participated:

Austria – Reform of Voting Rights 1907
Belgium – Treaty of Rome
Finland – Adolf Erik Nordenskiöld and the finding of the North-East Passage
France – Vauban
Hungary – 200th anniversary of the birth of Lajos Batthyány
Ireland – Influence of Celtic Culture on Europe
Italy – Treaty of Rome
Malta – Jean Parisot de la Valette
Netherlands – Treaty of Rome
Portugal – The flight of Bartolomeu de Gusmão, 1709
Spain – Treaty of Rome

Belgium

Malta

See also

External links
 The €uro Collection Forum

References

Coins of the Eurozone